Fifth Avenue Models is a 1925 American silent drama film directed by Svend Gade and starring Mary Philbin, Norman Kerry, and Josef Swickard. It was produced and released by Universal Pictures.

Plot
As described in a review in a film magazine, Isobel Ludant (Philbin), the beautiful daughter of a talented but unsuccessful artist, is the breadwinner of the family, working in the shop of fashionable modiste. One night she is forced to act as a mannequin and gains the attention of art dealer Francis Doran (Kerry). As a result of a remark made by one of the other mannequins, Isobel attacks the young woman and is discharged. Before she reaches home, a man from the modeste's shop tells her that her father will be arrested unless she pays $150 for the dress she ruined in the fight. To save his daughter, the father (Ludant) goes with some crooks to identify a painting they want to steal, but he is caught and sent to Sing Sing. From then on, Isobel is placed in many suspicious situations as secretary to Doran, who knows nothing of what happened to the father. Doran loves her, but she believes his attentions mean less than marriage until he stands by her when her father is released from jail and his disgrace is blazoned to the world, at the time Doran's masterpiece is acclaimed by critics.

Cast

Preservation
A print of Fifth Avenue Models is held at the UCLA Film and Television Archive in Los Angeles.

References

Bibliography
 Goble, Alan. The Complete Index to Literary Sources in Film. Walter de Gruyter, 1999.

External links

1925 films
1925 drama films
Silent American drama films
Films directed by Svend Gade
American silent feature films
1920s English-language films
Universal Pictures films
American black-and-white films
Films set in New York City
1920s American films